Snape Wood is a council estate located in Bulwell Ward at the City of Nottingham. At the 2001 census, the estate had a population of 2,937.

Facilities
Snape Wood has facilities located on Snape Wood Road including a community centre, a family centre, a driving school, and a small park next to the community centre, and there's also a primary school and a local convenience store located off Aspen Road.

Demographics
According to the 2001 census data, the estate has a population of 2,937. A majority of the population is aged 25–44 who make up 32% of the population.
The census also shows that 91.7% of the estate's population is White, 3.4% is Mixed Race, 1.4% is Asian or Asian British, and 3.3% is Black or Black British. Chinese people and other ethnic groups each make up 0.1% of the estate's population.

Religion
The 2001 census shows that 59.6% of the population are Christian and 27.8% of the population are Atheists. Meanwhile, 0.3% of the population practice Hinduism, and Buddhism and Judaism each score 0.1%. Then, 1.1% of the population are Muslim, 0.2% are Sikh and 10.7% of the population did not state their religion.

Bus services

References

Areas of Nottingham